Jamal Mashburn Jr. (born September 29, 2001) is an American college basketball player for the New Mexico Lobos of the Mountain West Conference (MWC). He previously played for the Minnesota Golden Gophers.

Early life and high school career
Mashburn is the son of former NBA player Jamal Mashburn. The younger Mashburn grew up playing baseball and lacrosse, and only turned to basketball at age 10. He began his high school career at Gulliver Prep and averaged 24 points per game as a freshman. As a sophomore, Mashburn averaged 27.4 points per game. He earned first-team all-state honors. For his junior season, Mashburn transferred to Brewster Academy. At Brewster Academy, he played alongside teammates Kai Jones, Jalen Lecque, Terrence Clarke, and Kadary Richmond. As a senior, he earned first team All-New England Prep School Class AAA honors and led Brewster to the National Prep Showcase championship game, which was cancelled due to the COVID-19 pandemic. Mashburn was regarded as a four-star prospect ranked the No. 88 recruit in his class and committed to Minnesota over offers from California, Auburn, Georgetown, and Saint Louis.

College career
On February 17, 2021, Mashburn scored a freshman season-high 19 points in an 82–72 loss to Indiana. He began receiving more playing time due to an injury to Gabe Kalscheur. Mashburn made eight starts as a freshman at Minnesota and averaged 8.2 points, 1.6 rebounds and 1.6 assists per game. For his sophomore season, he transferred to New Mexico. Mashburn followed his coach Richard Pitino, who was hired to coach the Lobos. On January 8, 2022, Mashburn scored a career-high 29 points and had eight assists in a 90-87 overtime loss to Nevada. He was named to the Third Team All-Mountain West as a sophomore.

Career statistics

College

|-
| style="text-align:left;"| 2020–21
| style="text-align:left;"| Minnesota
| 29 || 8 || 22.1 || .350 || .276 || .796 || 1.6 || 1.6 || .4 || .1 || 8.2
|-
| style="text-align:left;"| 2021–22
| style="text-align:left;"| New Mexico
| 32 || 32 || 33.9 || .428 || .342 || .787 || 2.7 || 2.1 || .6 || .1 || 18.2

References

External links
New Mexico Lobos bio
Minnesota Golden Gophers bio

2001 births
Living people
American men's basketball players
Shooting guards
Minnesota Golden Gophers men's basketball players
New Mexico Lobos men's basketball players
Basketball players from Florida
People from Pinecrest, Florida
Brewster Academy alumni